Chalker is a surname. Notable people with the surname include:

Curly Chalker (1931–1998), American musician
Dennis Chalker (born 1954), United States Navy sailor, inventor and writer
Jack Bridger Chalker (born 1918), English artist
Jack L. Chalker (1944–2005), American writer
James Chalker (1912-2003), Canadian politician and businessman
Lloyd Chalker (1883–1981), United States Coast Guard officer
Lynda Chalker, Baroness Chalker of Wallasey (born 1942), British politician
Rebecca Chalker (born 1943), American health writer and women's rights activist
Will Chalker (born 1980), English model

Occupational surnames